Tjörnes is a peninsula situated at the northeast of Iceland, between the fjords of Öxarfjörður and Skjálfandi. Tjörnes is known for its particularly dense population of Rock Ptarmigan and the rich fossil record of Miocene - Pliocene age.

The submarine volcano

There is a submarine volcano north of Iceland named the Tjornes Fracture Zone. It is a series of underwater fissure vents that last erupted in 1868.

References

Peninsulas of Iceland